A cream liqueur is a liqueur that includes dairy cream  and a generally flavourful liquor among its ingredients.

Notable cream liqueurs include:
Amarula, which uses distillate of fermented South African marula fruits
Irish cream, which uses Irish whiskey
Cruzan Rum, with rum and other ingredients
Dooley's, which uses toffee and vodka
Heather Cream, uses Scotch whisky
Voodoo Cream Liqueur, an Indian cream liqueur with whisky
RumChata, a mixture of rum and horchata

See also
List of liqueurs
Nightcap (drink)

References

Liqueurs